Mykhaylo Renzhyn (born October 15, 1978), also known as Mikail Renzhin, is an Israeli Alpine skier. Renzhyn competed in the 2006 Winter Olympics and also represented Israel at the 2010 Winter Olympics after having represented Ukraine until 2001.

External links 
 
 Mykhaylo Renzhyn at the Vancouver 2010 Winter Olympics website
 
 

Israeli male alpine skiers
Ukrainian male alpine skiers
1978 births
Olympic alpine skiers of Israel
Alpine skiers at the 2006 Winter Olympics
Alpine skiers at the 2010 Winter Olympics
Living people
Israeli people of Ukrainian descent